Priscilla Long (born 1943) is an American writer and political activist. She co-founded a Boston consciousness raising group that contributed to Bread and Roses. A longtime anti-war activist, 
Long was arrested in the 1963 Gwynn Oak Park sit-in.

Works 
 The New Left: A Collection of Essays, as editor (1969, Porter Sargent)
 Where the Sun Never Shines: A History of America's Bloody Coal Industry (1989, Paragon House)
 "We Called Ourselves Sisters" in The Feminist Memoir Project (1998, Three Rivers Press)

References

External links 
 
 Archival papers in the University of Washington Libraries

 

1943 births
Living people
American writers
American feminists
American anti-war activists
Antioch College alumni
University of Washington alumni